The village of Neola is an unincorporated populated area spanning Jackson and Hamilton Townships at the foothills of the Pocono Mountains in Monroe County, Pennsylvania.

References

Pocono Mountains
Unincorporated communities in Monroe County, Pennsylvania
Unincorporated communities in Pennsylvania